George Hurwood (1798 - 1864) was an English engineer active in Ipswich, Suffolk. He played a major role in the installation and development of Ipswich Docks.

He was the son of William Hurwood, a millwright based in Ballingdon, near Sudbury. After an apprenticeship with his uncle, Samuel Wright, also a millwright, but based in Ipswich, George developed a broad range of skills. These he further developed through devoting much of his spare time to making working models of various machines including a model steam engine.

In 1842 Hurwood succeeded Henry Robinson Palmer running Ipswich Dock, when Palmer relinquished the post following he completion of the dock in 1842. In 1860 Hurwood gave a presentation about the River Orwell and the Port of Ipswich summarising the work of William Chapman and Palmer and subsequent developments  following his appointment.

References

1798 births
1864 deaths
English civil engineers